Isognathus is a genus of moths in the family Sphingidae.

Species
Isognathus allamandae Clark, 1920
Isognathus australis Clark, 1917
Isognathus caricae (Linnaeus, 1758)
Isognathus excelsior (Boisduval, 1875)
Isognathus leachii (Swainson, 1823)
Isognathus menechus (Boisduval, 1875)
Isognathus mossi Clark, 1919
Isognathus occidentalis Clark, 1929
Isognathus rimosa (Grote, 1865)
Isognathus scyron (Cramer, 1780)
Isognathus swainsonii Felder & Felder, 1862

References

 
Dilophonotini
Moth genera
Taxa named by Baron Cajetan von Felder
Taxa named by Rudolf Felder